Elk Grove can refer to:

Places in the United States
Elk Grove, California, in Sacramento County
Elk Grove, Humboldt County, California
Elk Grove Village, Illinois
Elk Grove, Wisconsin, a town
Elk Grove (community), Wisconsin, an unincorporated community

See also
 Elk Grove Unified School District v. Newdow